Maloarkhangelsk is the name of several inhabited localities in Russia.

Urban localities
Maloarkhangelsk, Oryol Oblast, a town in Maloarkhangelsky District of Oryol Oblast

Rural localities
Maloarkhangelsk, Zabaykalsky Krai, a selo in Krasnochikoysky District of Zabaykalsky Krai

See also
stantsii Maloarkhangelsk, a rural locality (a settlement) in Maloarkhangelsky District of Oryol Oblast
Arkhangelsk, a city in Arkhangelsk Oblast